The Duchy of Lancaster Act 1817 (57 Geo 3 c 97) is an Act of the Parliament of the United Kingdom.

The Duchy of Lancaster Act 1817 was repealed, excepting so far as any powers, provisions, matters or things related to or affected the Duchy of Lancaster or any of the hereditaments, possessions or property within the ordering and survey of the Duchy of Lancaster, by section 1 of the Crown Lands Act 1829 (10 Geo 4 c 50).

References
Halsbury's Statutes,

External links
The Duchy of Lancaster Act 1817, as amended, from the National Archives.
The Duchy of Lancaster Act 1817, as originally enacted, from the National Archives.

United Kingdom Acts of Parliament 1817
Duchy of Lancaster